Chaim Mordechai Katz (1894–1964) was an Orthodox rabbi, the Rosh Yeshiva of the Telshe Yeshiva in Cleveland, and among American Jewry's foremost religious leaders.

Pre-War Years 

Katz was born in 1894 in Shadova, Russian Empire. As a young man, he studied in the yeshiva in Shadova, under the tutelage of the town's rabbi and Rosh Yeshiva, Rabbi Yosef Leib Bloch.  In 1910, he went to study in the Knesses Beis Yitzchak yeshiva in Slobodka for a year, following which, in 1911, he returned to study under Bloch, who had been appointed as Chief Rabbi and Rosh Yeshiva in Telz.

In 1914, Katz went to the Volozhin Yeshiva for two years where he was ordained by Rabbi Refael Shapiro, the son-in-law of the Netziv. In 1916 he studied under Rabbi Shlomo Polachek, the renowned "Maitziter Illuy". In 1918 he returned to Telz, where he married Perel Leah, Bloch's daughter.

In 1920, Katz assisted his father in law in the founding of a preparatory school for young men (Mechina), which would prepare younger students for study in the yeshiva proper. Katz was appointed director of the Mechina. In 1922, a postgraduate institute (Kollel) was founded in Telz and he was appointed Head of the institute.

In 1930, Katz's father, wife, third oldest child (Shmuel, aged six) and father in law died. The following year he married Chaya Kravitz, Bloch's niece.

In 1934, Katz was one of the founders of the Zeirei Agudath Israel in Lithuania and he served as the head of the Board of Action (Va'ad Hapoel). Together with his brother in law, Rabbi Eliyahu Meir Bloch, he also served as one of the editors of the Agudah newspaper in Lithuania: "Dos Yiddishe Lebben".

He participated in the first Knessiah Gedolah of the Agudath Israel in 1923 and at the third Knessiah Gedolah in 1937 he was appointed a member of the International Action Committee (Va'ad Hapoel Ha'olami).

World War II and relocation to the USA 

In 1940, Katz and Eliyahu Meir Bloch managed to travel out of Soviet occupied Lithuania and make their way to the United States, in the hope of re-establishing the Rabbinical College of Telshe and bringing over its faculty and student body. Both Katz and Bloch were unable to bring their wives and children, the fate of whom remained unknown to them until 1944.

In October 1942 Katz and Bloch re-established the Telz Yeshiva in Cleveland, Ohio. Together, in 1943 they established a Jewish day school: The Hebrew Academy of Cleveland.

Towards the end of the war Katz discovered that his wife and 10 children had been killed by Nazi forces in Telz in 1941. Bloch's family suffered a similar fate.

In 1946 Katz married Esther Mindle Mandel. In 1947 Katz and Bloch established a Hebrew School for girls in Cleveland called Yavneh, under the framework of the Hebrew Academy of Cleveland.

Telz Cleveland 

In 1954 Rabbi Eliyahu Meir Bloch died, and Katz became head of the yeshiva (Rosh Yeshiva).

In addition to running the yeshiva, Katz remained very communally active, both locally, nationally and internationally.

Katz served as a member on the Moetzes Gedolei HaTorah of the Agudath Israel. Together with Rabbi Aharon Kotler, he undertook to ensure the financial needs of the Chinuch Atzmai (religious education network in Israel) were met, encouraging the students of the yeshiva to raise funds for Chinuch Atzmai in their vacation period. In 1957 the yeshiva moved from downtown Cleveland to its present-day location in Wickliffe, Ohio, on the outskirts of Cleveland.

In winter of 1958 he was hospitalized for a serious heart attack. Despite his health, he continued to actively run the yeshiva and remained active in the wider community.

In 1960 he established Telshe Chicago - a branch of the yeshiva in Chicago, Illinois.

On Tuesday morning, January 1, 1963, a fire broke out in one of the three dormitories at the yeshiva. Two students died in the fire and local authorities closed the remaining two dormitories as a safety measure.  Katz guided the yeshiva through the difficult period, again, rebuilding. That year he participated at the Knessiah Gedolah of the Agudath Israel in Jerusalem, where he spoke on numerous occasions.

On November 17, 1964 Katz suffered a massive heart attack and died. He was interred on Har HaMenuchot.

His son Rabbi Yaakov Zev (Velvel) Katz founded and leads the Cedar-Green Community Kollel in Beachwood Ohio, officially named Kollel Yad Chaim Mordechai, after his father.

Hs Daughter Rochel married Rabbi Avroham Gershon Tress, son of noted askan Rabbi Mike Tress. She lives in Monsey, NY 

His Youngest son Rabbi Avneir Katz lives in Brooklyn NY and is a rav hamachsir.

Personality 

Affectionately known by his students as Reb Mottel, Katz was a Lithuanian born and trained rabbi who was catapulted into a very different social setting than he was accustomed. Despite the great differences in American perspective, he successfully bridged any gaps with his students, and succeeded in educating and inspiring them. Under his leadership, the Telz Yeshiva grew to its largest. He was a master educator and communal activist who was exacting in his attention to detail. He used to say: "To a big man there are no such things as small things".

References
Be'er Mechokek - Published by Rabbi Yaakov Z. Katz, Wickliffe, Ohio 1989.

1894 births
1964 deaths
Rosh yeshivas
American Haredi rabbis
Lithuanian emigrants to the United States
Burials at Har HaMenuchot
Lithuanian Haredi rabbis
People from Šeduva
Rabbis from Ohio